Madame Récamier is a 1920 German silent historical film directed by Joseph Delmont and starring Fern Andra, Bernd Aldor and Albert Steinrück. The film portrays the life of Juliette Récamier, a French society figure of the Napoleonic Era.

Cast
 Fern Andra as Madame Récamier  
 Bernd Aldor as Talma
 Albert Steinrück 
 Ferdinand von Alten as Napoleon Bonaparte
 Johanna Mund as Joséphine de Beauharnais
 Viktor Senger as Pierre Bernard  
 Else Wasa as Marie  
 Rudolf Lettinger as Jacques Récamier  
 Hermann Böttcher as Fouche  
 Adolf E. Licho as Robert  
 Emil Rameau as Dufrand 
 Walter Formes as Graf Artois  
 Doris Schlegel as Blanche 
 Boris Michailow as Constand

References

Bibliography 
 Klossner, Michael. The Europe of 1500-1815 on Film and Television: A Worldwide Filmography of Over 2550 Works, 1895 Through 2000. McFarland, 2002.

External links 
 

1920 films
1920s historical films
German historical films
German silent feature films
Films of the Weimar Republic
Films directed by Joseph Delmont
Films set in the 1790s
Films set in the 1800s
Films set in the 1810s
Films set in Paris
Depictions of Napoleon on film
Cultural depictions of Joséphine de Beauharnais
German black-and-white films
1920s German films